Seven Mile Beach can refer to:
 Seven Mile Beach, Grand Cayman, in the Caribbean
 Seven Mile Beach (New South Wales), in the Kiama region of New South Wales, Australia
 Seven Mile Beach, Tasmania, near Lauderdale, Tasmania, Australia